Ann Curtis is a costume designer who has designed costumes in films and Broadway theater dramas like Anthony and Cleopatra (1972), Me and My Girl (1987) and Jekyll & Hyde (1997).

Career
In an interview after the film version of Anthony & Cleopatra, Curtis commented that the world of ancient Egypt (in particular the ancient Egyptian script) provided inspiration for her designs. However, she did not want to be slavishly accurate.

Filmography
The Rothschilds (1970–1972)
A Midsummer Night's Dream (1968)
The Wars (1983)
Jekyll & Hyde (2001)
Me and My Girl (1987)
Antony and Cleopatra (1974)

Awards
Tony Award for Best Costume Design
1987 for "Me and My Girl" – nominated
1997 for "Jekyll and Hyde (musical)" – nominated

References

External links
 
 W.H. Crain Costume and Scene Design Collection at the Harry Ransom Center

Year of birth missing (living people)
Living people
Fashion stylists
American costume designers
Women costume designers